NGC 772 (also known as Arp 78) is an unbarred spiral galaxy approximately 130 million light-years away in the constellation Aries.

Characteristics 

At around 200,000 light years in diameter, NGC 772 is somewhat larger than the Milky Way Galaxy, and is surrounded by several satellite galaxies – including the dwarf elliptical, NGC 770 – whose tidal forces on the larger galaxy have likely caused the emergence of a  single elongated outer spiral arm that is much more developed than the others arms. Halton Arp includes NGC 772 in his Atlas of Peculiar Galaxies as Arp 78, where it is described as a "Spiral galaxy with a small high-surface brightness companion".

Two supernovae, SN 2003 hl (discovered August 20, 2003) and SN 2003 iq (discovered October 8th, 2003), have been observed in NGC 772. Both were Type II. 

NGC 772 probably has a H II nucleus, but it may be a transitional object.

Gallery

See also
 NGC 1097
 Whirlpool Galaxy

References

External links

 Spiral Galaxy NGC 772; Elliptical Galaxy NGC 770
 
 NGC 772 (Arp 78) at Constellation Guide

Unbarred spiral galaxies
Aries (constellation)
0772
01466
07525
078
Interacting galaxies